Methoprene is a juvenile hormone (JH) analog which acts as a growth regulator when used as an insecticide.  It is an amber-colored liquid with a faint fruity odor.

Methoprene does not kill insects.  Instead, it interferes with an insect’s life cycle and prevents it from reaching maturity or
reproducing.  Juvenile growth hormones must be absent for a pupa to molt to an adult, so methoprene-treated larvae will be unable to successfully change from  pupae to adults.  This breaks the biological life cycle of the insect, preventing recurring infestation.

Methoprene is considered a biological pesticide because rather than controlling target pests through direct toxicity, methoprene interferes with an insect’s lifecycle and prevents it from reaching maturity or reproducing.

Applications
Methoprene is used in the production of a number of foods, including meat, milk, mushrooms, peanuts, rice, and cereals. It also has several uses on domestic animals (pets) for controlling fleas.

It is used in drinking water cisterns to control mosquitoes which spread dengue fever and malaria. Methoprene is commonly used as a mosquito larvicide used to help stop the spread of the West Nile virus.

Methoprene is also used as a food additive in cattle feed to prevent fly breeding in the manure.

Health and Safety Issues

According to the Safety Data Sheet (SDS), methoprene is a material that may be irritating to the mucous membranes and upper respiratory tract, may be harmful by inhalation, ingestion, or skin absorption, may cause eye, skin, or respiratory system irritation and is very toxic to aquatic life. The GHS signal word is "Warning," with notes such as P273 Avoid release into the environment and P391 collect spillage.

Methoprene  is suspected to be highly toxic to lobsters.

References

External links
 Methoprene Pesticide Fact Sheet - Environmental Protection Agency
 Methoprene Pesticide Information Profile - Extension Toxicology Network
 

Insecticides
Carboxylate esters
Ethers
Dienes
Isopropyl esters